Heterocrossa eriphylla, also known as the lichen snoutlet moth, is a species of moth in the family Carposinidae. It is endemic to New Zealand. The larvae of this species feed on the healing wounds of New Zealand beech trees.

Taxonomy 
This species was described by Edward Meyrick in 1888 using a specimen he collected in Wellington in January. In 1922 Meyrick classified Heterocrossa as a synonym of the genus Carposina. George Hudson discussed and illustrated this species in his 1928 publication The Butterflies and Moths of New Zealand. In 1978 Elwood Zimmerman argued that the genus Heterocrassa  should not be a synonym of Carposina as the genitalia of the species within the genus Heterocrassa are distinctive. In 1988 John S. Dugdale assigned the species back to the genus Heterocrossa. The holotype specimen is held at the Natural History Museum, London.

Description 
H. eriphylla was described by Meyrick as follows:

Distribution 
This species is endemic to New Zealand. This species is found in the North Island and northern parts of the South Island. Specimens of this moth have been collected near the Wellington Botanic Gardens and at the Ōrongorongo Valley, as well as near Woodville in hill country. This moth has also been collected at Paroa. H. eriphylla is regarded as being relatively uncommon.

Biology and behaviour 

The adult moths are on the wing in December to April, May and June. This moth is a night flier and is attracted to light. During the day the adult moths rest on tree trunks where their variable lichen mimicking colouration assists with their camouflage.  W. P. Cohen stated that he collected his specimens during the day while they were at rest on the trunks of weeping-willows. The larvae of this species feed on the callus tissue generated by their host trees as a result of damage caused by other insects. The larvae are believed to facilitate the development of rot in beech trees by keeping wounds open to the air. The species pupates at their feeding site.

Host species 

H. eriphylla lives in native forest habitat. The larvae of this species feed on the wood of the beech trees Fuscospora fusca and Fuscospora truncata.

References

External links

Image of holotype specimen

Carposinidae
Moths of New Zealand
Moths described in 1888
Endemic fauna of New Zealand
Taxa named by Edward Meyrick
Endemic moths of New Zealand